Estadio El Gigante del Norte, officially named Monumental de la Vicente López, is a multi-use stadium in Salta, Argentina.  It is currently used mostly for football matches.  The stadium holds 25,000 people and was built in 1993.

References

g
Buildings and structures in Salta
Sport in Salta Province